Tom Bean is a city in Grayson County, Texas, United States. The population was 1,045 at the 2010 census, up from 941 at the 2000 census.

Tom Bean is part of the Sherman–Denison Metropolitan Statistical Area.

Geography

Tom Bean is located in southeastern Grayson County at  (33.520811, –96.482826). The region is colloquially referred to as the Sher-Den area or Texomaland—or just Texoma.

History 
Thomas Bean, a wealthy Bonham landowner and surveyor, donated  of land in southeast Grayson County to be used for a branch railroad line from Sherman to Commerce. Bean died in 1887; in that year the city of Tom Bean was established. Nearby Whitemound, which was bypassed by the railroad, lost its post office to Tom Bean's city in 1888; many Whitemound settlers moved to the new town. Mr. Bean's estate began to sell town lots surrounding the railroad in the 1890s. The city school was moved in 1891 from a one-room structure to a two-story building with an auditorium. Several Christian denominations, including the Church of Christ, Baptist, Presbyterian, and Methodist, established churches in town. The city charter was signed in 1897, and the first mayor was Ice B. Reeves.

In the early days of the 20th century, the city boomed. Within a few years, it boasted a grain company, a furniture company, a drugstore, a newspaper called the Tom Bean Bulletin, a saloon, a dance hall, a movie theater, and the Tom Bean social club. As time progressed, the sharp increase in automobile travel and transport, and the decline of cotton as the principal crop of the area, led businesses to the larger cities of Denison and Sherman.

Though never again the railroad boomtown of the late 19th and early 20th centuries, the community enjoyed a growth spurt in the 1950s and 1980s, celebrating its centennial in 1987.

Current growth is due to its proximity to nearby Sherman,  to the northwest.

The most famous person to come out of the city of Tom Bean, is Justin Pierce. Justin worked to earn a full athletic scholarship and would go on to play 4 years of college football at Purdue University. One of the best, and most athletic plays Justin made, was recovering a fumble against the University of Oregon and returning gaining 7 yards.

Demographics

2020 census

As of the 2020 United States census, there were 930 people, 400 households, and 289 families residing in the city.

2000 census
As of the census of 2000, there were 941 people, 357 households, and 263 families residing in the city. The population density was 667.0 people per square mile (257.7/km). There were 380 housing units at an average density of 269.4 per square mile (104.1/km). The racial makeup of the city was 96.17% White, 0.43% African American, 1.17% Native American, 0.21% Asian, 0.21% Pacific Islander, 0.64% from other races, and 1.17% from two or more races. Hispanic or Latino of any race were 3.93% of the population.

There were 357 households, out of which 41.7% had children under the age of 18 living with them, 58.0% were married couples living together, 12.0% had a female householder with no husband present, and 26.1% were non-families. 24.4% of all households were made up of individuals, and 12.9% had someone living alone who was 65 years of age or older. The average household size was 2.64 and the average family size was 3.15.

In the city, the population was spread out, with 32.1% under the age of 18, 6.4% from 18 to 24, 31.8% from 25 to 44, 19.9% from 45 to 64, and 9.9% who were 65 years of age or older. The median age was 32 years. For every 100 females, there were 91.3 males. For every 100 females age 18 and over, there were 82.1 males.

The median income for a household in the city was $38,875, and the median income for a family was $50,000. Males had a median income of $37,750 versus $23,036 for females. The per capita income for the city was $16,113. About 7.6% of families and 9.0% of the population were below the poverty line, including 9.2% of those under age 18 and 25.5% of those age 65 or over.

Education
The City of Tom Bean is served by the Tom Bean Independent School District and home to the Tom Bean High School Tom Cats.

References

"Three Bean Salad"

External links
 City of Tom Bean official website

Cities in Grayson County, Texas
Cities in Texas